In algebraic geometry, a Spaltenstein variety is a variety given by the fixed point set of a nilpotent transformation on a flag variety. In the special case of full flag varieties the Spaltenstein varieties are Springer varieties.

References

Algebraic groups